Mabel's Nerve (1914) is a comedy film starring Mabel Normand and directed by George Nichols.

External links
Mabel's Nerve at the Internet Movie Database

 
Madcap Mabel: Mabel Normand Website
Looking-for-Mabel
Mabel Normand Home Page

1914 films
Silent American comedy films
American black-and-white films
American silent short films
1914 comedy films
1914 short films
American comedy short films
Films directed by George Nichols
1910s American films